The Fake accounts case is a case being heard by the Supreme Court of Pakistan (SCP) under which former President of Pakistan Asif Ali Zardari, his sisters Faryal Talpur and Azra Fazal Pechuho, and son Bilawal Bhutto Zardari, are accused of money laundering through 29 fake accounts registered in Summit Bank, Sindh Bank, and United Bank Limited under people's names who themselves were not aware of those accounts. Others being investigated are Sara Tareen Majeed, Khawaja Kamal Majeed, Khawaja Mustafa Zulqarnain Majeed, and Saima Ali Majeed.

Khawaja Anwar Majeed and Abdul Ghani Majeed are under arrest since 15 August 2018. They were arrested from inside Supreme Court of Pakistan building after they appeared to defend themselves in a "Rs35 billion fake accounts case".

Background

This case was initially opened against Hussain Lawai in 2015 who is a former chairman of Pakistan Stock Exchange and a close associate of Zardari.

Case facts
During court proceedings on 6 September 2018, two more companies M/s Landmarks and M/s NGS were revealed in addition to already identified companies which were used to launder billions of rupees. M/s Landmarks is owned by Zardari, Talpur, and Pechuho in a partnership.

Joint Investigation Team
The Supreme Court of Pakistan ordered creation of a joint investigation team (JIT) to investigate the charges against the accused on 6 September 2018. The JIT members are Imran Latif Minhas, Majid Hussain, Nauman Aslam, Muhammad Afzal, and Brigadier Shahid Pervaiz. The JIT is headed by Ahsan Sadiq who is an additional director general in FIA.

Minhas is a commissioner at the Regional Tax Office, Islamabad, Hussain is a joint director with the State Bank of Pakistan, Aslam is a director with the National Accountability Bureau, Afzal is a director with the Securities and Exchange Commission of Pakistan, and Pervaiz is associated with Inter-Services Intelligence, while contrary to the JIT for Panama Papers case, there is no representation from Military Intelligence in the JIT constituted for this case as of yet.

The JIT will derive its powers from all existing laws regarding investigations and inquiries including Anti Corruption Laws, National Accountability Ordinance's Code of Criminal Procedure, and Federal Investigation Agency Act of 1974. JIT will have at their disposal all the executive agencies and authorities to assist it where needed to complete this investigation. Pakistan Rangers is tasked with providing security to the JIT members and witnesses.

The JIT's task is to uncover all who are involved in this matter and collect fool-proof evidence against them so they can be effectively prosecuted. To complete this task, JIT will have at their disposal to garner services of any expert. It will be mandatory for this investigative body to keep SCP apprised about their progress in the investigation on "fortnightly basis".

References

Supreme Court of Pakistan cases
2018 in politics
2018 in Pakistani politics
Corruption in Pakistan
Asif Ali Zardari